Serralunga may refer to two comuni in northern Italy:

Serralunga d'Alba, province of Cuneo
Serralunga di Crea, province of Alessandria